The 2001 British motorcycle Grand Prix was the eighth round of the 2001 Grand Prix motorcycle racing season. It took place on the weekend of 6–8 July 2001 at Donington Park.

500 cc classification

250 cc race classification

125 cc classification

Championship standings after the race (500cc)

Below are the standings for the top five riders and constructors after round eight has concluded.

Riders' Championship standings

Constructors' Championship standings

 Note: Only the top five positions are included for both sets of standings.

References

British motorcycle Grand Prix
British
Motorcycle Grand Prix
July 2001 sports events in the United Kingdom